Muy padres (stylized as ¡Muy padr3s!) is a Mexican telenovela produced by Agustín Restrepo and Aurelio Valcárcel Carroll for Imagen Televisión that premiered on September 18, 2017. This is the fourth original production of Imagen Televisión and bringing with it new talents. It is an adaptation of the Argentine story written by Marcela Guerty and Pamela Rementería titled Señores Papis. The telenovela revolves around three dads and the relationship problems between parents and children, as well as situations of single parents who care for their children, besides addressing topics such as alcoholism, child sexual abuse and children with Down syndrome.

Starring Dulce María, Víctor González, Mario Morán and Héctor Suárez Gomís in their debut on the television channel, along to Betty Monroe, Jessica Díaz and Mariel Chantal. It also has the star participation of Issabela Camil, Roberto Mateos and Sandra Destenave.

Plot 
This is the story of three dads: Emilio (Víctor González), Ricardo (Héctor Suárez Gomis) and Alan (Mario Morán). They meet in their children's kindergarten. Emilio is a businessman who likes to live surrounded by women, but his life takes a turn when Sofia (Fran Meric), a woman he had to see in the past, comes to his apartment and tells him that he has a son named Santiago (Checo Perezcuadra). Sofia flees, leaving her son in Emilio's care. After the incident, Emilio does not know what to do with the child. It's when he enrolls him in the Monarca kindergarten, where Pamela (Dulce María) works, an honest, passionate and free woman. Previously she and Emilio had already met when she ran over him while he ran behind Sofia in her escape; It is where you will initiate a great love that will change you both.

Alan is a single father, a rebellious and partying young man who takes care of his little son Arturo (Ari Placera), since his girlfriend died years ago. His in-laws, Rodolfo (Roberto Mateos) and Silvia (Sandra Destenave), disagree about him taking care of the boy, because they think it's bad influence for Arturo. Rodolfo and Silvia, will try to take away the homeland protested at any cost. But there comes Jenny (Jessica Díaz), a new neighbor and lawyer from Arturo who will help her get her son back. In the middle of the process, they fall madly in love.

Ricardo is a quiet father, but proud and resentful. After separating from his first wife, Margarita (Betty Monroe), with whom he has two daughters: Tania (Macarena García) and Regina (Valery Sais), he finds love again with Kika (Mariel Chantal), a younger woman who is about to give birth to his third daughter.

Between entanglements and situations these three dads will become very great friends sharing their joys and disappointments. Dealing with their roles as workers, spouses and especially parents, making mistakes and successes, but always with good intentions and with all their hearts.

Cast

Main 
 Dulce María as Pamela Díaz
 Víctor González as Emilio Palacios Fernández
 Betty Monroe as Margarita Rivapalacio
 Mario Morán as Alan de Garay Álvarez
 Héctor Suárez Gomís as Ricardo Pérez Valdez
 Jessica Díaz as Jennifer Salamanca
 Mariel Chantal as Érika López de Pérez
 Roberto Mateos as Rodolfo Villagrana
 Sandra Destenave as Silvia de Villagrana
 Fran Meric as Sofía Urrutia González
 Issabela Camil as Deborah
 Diego Soldano as Matías Montellano
 Adriana Leal as Perla
 Aranza Carreiro as Patricia Villagrana Juárez
 Macarena García as Tania Pérez Rivapalacio
 Julio Casado as Abelardo
 Alberto Reyes as Bicho
 Valery Sais as Regina Pérez Rivapalacio
 Checo Perezcuadra as Santiago Urrutia González
 Ari Placera as Arturo de Garay Villagrana

Recurring 
 Claudio Roca as Nicolás
 María Prado as Carmelita
 Tamara Guzmán as Beatriz Esther Gómez Chávez
 Javier Ponce as Antonio
 Eva Prado as Elena Álvarez
 Mimi Morales as Gina Paola
 Alma Moreno as Rosita
 Carlos Hays as Diego
 Jonnathan Kuri as Leonardo Oliver
 Óscar Bonfiglio as Javier
 David Ostrosky as Alfredo Elizalde
 Eduardo Shacklett as Eduardo Fabbri
 Sergio Jurado as Bernardo Salamanca
 Alan Ciangherotti as Marco
 Andrea Carreiro as Ángela Villagrana Juárez
 Jorge Rodolfo Almada as César
 Juan Felipe Pulido as Jhon Freddy
 Paola Díaz Cardona as Maryssol Ferrer
 Israel Salmer as Erick
 Zully Keith as Nena Rivapalacio

Special participation 
 Lupita Lara as Miriam
 Paco de la Fuente as Christian González
 Luz María Zetina as herself

Production 
In May 2017 Telefe announced that after the success of the Argentinean version of Señores Papis the novela would have a Mexican version produced and transmitted by Imagen Televisión. As the Argentinean version, Telefe also be in charge of distributing the Mexican version worldwide. The telenovela was formerly known as Papis muy padres.

Production of the series began on July 17, 2017, being the fourth original production of Imagen Televisión and the first to debut the channel recording studios.

Casting 
On June 19, 2017, journalist Gil Barrera reported in the Mexican newspaper El Gráfico that Dulce María, Víctor González and Héctor Suárez Gomís would be the protagonists of the new series of Imagen Televisión. At the end of the month, Dulce María signed a contract with the channel confirming that she would be the protagonist of the new production.

On July 17, the recordings of the novel began, confirming Dulce María, Víctor González, Héctor Suárez Gomís, Mario Morán, Betty Monroe, Isabella Camil, Fran Meric, Roberto Mateos, Mariel Chantal, Jessica Díaz, Aranza Carreiro, Sandra Destenave, Diego Soldano and Alberto Reyes in the cast.

Music 
The main theme of the telenovela "Borrón Y Cuenta Nueva" was composed by Dulce María, Pepe Portilla, Héctor Mena, Lito de la Isla and Oliver García and performed by Dulce María. The second song titled "Quédate" performed by Jessica Díaz was released as theme of Alan and Jenny.

Reception 
Upon release, Muy Padres received generally positive reviews by critics. The journalist Alex Piñón of the Mexican website Siete24 stated commented that the viewers will laugh from the first episode and it is not the typical comedy that the characters are embarrassed for being extremely exaggerated, that in this series, we will see "real" characters with whom we can identify ourselves. About the cast, he said that the acting maturity of the cast is notorious and the director managed to get the best of them, Betty Monroe and Dulce María are very well, as we see both in another facet and the children's cast are simply charming and steal the hearts of the audience.

In its debut month, Muy Padres entered the Social Wit List of the company The Wit (World Information Tracking), of all the new programs that were launched in Latin America during September and that generated more comments in the social networks. Muy Padres appeared in the fourth position with more than 12,000 comments.

The Chilean website Página 7 commented that "Muy Padres" had a final chapter praised, for the quality of performance and for its fun story. The site notes that the end was almost the same as the Chilean version and, like the Chilean version, they got good ratings. In addition, they had a good reception from the audience.

The journalist Lupita Martínez of the Mexican newspaper "El Gráfico" in her critique of the end of Muy Padres said that the series offered something different, that the dialogues full of tenderness between parents and children managed to move the viewer and attract him in common, credible but important situations that can happen in different families; the different ways of living a situation with children, without the radical melodrama, on the contrary, the stories were full of nuances. And she finished saying that nowadays it is important that the stories are told in this way and congratulated the production.

Episodes

Webisodes

¡Cocina junto a Alan! (2017)
It was published on YouTube 12 episodes with the character Alan, teaching recipes in his food truck, "Alebrije".

Awards and nominations

Notes

References

External links 

Imagen Televisión telenovelas
Mexican telenovelas
2017 telenovelas
2017 Mexican television series debuts
2018 Mexican television series endings
Mexican television series based on Argentine television series